Scabrotrophon densilamellatus is a species of sea snail, a marine gastropod mollusk in the family Muricidae, the murex snails or rock snails.

Description
The shell grows to a length of 30 mm.

Distribution
This species is distributed in the Pacific Ocean along the Kurile Islands, Russia, in the Okhotsk Sea.

References

 Golikov, A.N. & Gulbin, V.V. (1977). Prosobranchiate gastropods (Gastropoda, Prosobranchiata) of the shelf of Kurile Islands. II. Ordo Hamiglossa — Homoestropha [Брюхоногие переднежаберные моллюски (Gastropoda, Prosobranchiata) шельфа Курильских островов. II. Отряды Hamiglossa — Homoestropha]. Фауна прибрежных зон Курильских островов [Fauna of coastal zones of Kurile Islands]. Nauka. Moscow 172-268 [In Russian].
 Kantor Yu.I. & Sysoev A.V. (2006) Marine and brackish water Gastropoda of Russia and adjacent countries: an illustrated catalogue. Moscow: KMK Scientific Press. 372 pp. + 140 pls.

External links
 
 Houart, R.; Vermeij, G.; Wiedrick, S. (2019). New taxa and new synonymy in Muricidae (Neogastropoda: Pagodulinae, Trophoninae, Ocenebrinae) from the Northeast Pacific. Zoosymposia. 13(1): 184-241

densilamellatus
Gastropods described in 1977